Gilson Alvaristo (27 April 1956 – 28 March 2016) was a Brazilian cyclist. He competed at the 1980 Summer Olympics and the 1984 Summer Olympics.

References

External links
 

1956 births
2016 deaths
Brazilian male cyclists
Brazilian road racing cyclists
Olympic cyclists of Brazil
Cyclists at the 1980 Summer Olympics
Cyclists at the 1984 Summer Olympics
21st-century Brazilian people
20th-century Brazilian people